Hugo Salinas Price (born March 11, 1932) is a Mexican business magnate, investor, and philanthropist. He is the founder of Mexico's Elektra retail chain.

He also owns the second largest gold mine and silver mines in the state of Durango.

Biography 
Salinas was born on March 11, 1932 in Bryn Athyn, Pennsylvania, his mother's home town. His uncle Benjamin Salinas Westrup, along with his step-brother Joel Rocha, founded the furniture company Salinas y Rocha, which grew rapidly thanks to the possibility to pay with credit.

He graduated from the Academy of the New Church Secondary Schools in 1949. He studied at the Wharton School from University of Pennsylvania, at the Instituto Tecnológico y de Estudios Superiores de Monterrey (ITESM) and law from the Universidad Nacional Autónoma de México (UNAM).

Elektra began as a factory assembling electronic appliances for the Salinas y Rocha chain, a national retailer of appliances. Hugo Salinas Price became director of the company in 1952, and opened its first store Elektra in 1959. Elektra then set up a direct sales operation offering appliances on installments. By 1968, Elektra had opened 12 stores nationwide. Hugo Salinas Price retired from the company in 1987, leaving the 59-store retail network to his son Ricardo Salinas Pliego.

Other roles 

 Since 1997: founder and president of Mexican Civic Association Pro Silver, A.C.
 Since 1993: Honorary president of Grupo Elektra

Books

References
 A speech by Hugo Salinas Price August 25, 2016 http://www.plata.com.mx/Mplata/articulos/articlesFilt.asp?fiidarticulo=293

External links 
Plata.com.mx (in English) (New)
Hugo Salinas interviewed by GoldMoney Foundation

1934 births
Living people
Mexican billionaires
Mexican chief executives
Mexican people of American descent
Monterrey Institute of Technology and Higher Education alumni
Wharton School of the University of Pennsylvania alumni